Aleksandr Valeryevich Tsygankov (born 9 February 1968) is a Russian professional football coach and a former player.

Coaching career

Following resignation of Andrey Kobelev from manager position on November 15, 2012, Tsygankov was appointed as caretaker manager of FC Krylia Sovetov Samara for the first time. The next year, he was appointed as caretaker manager of FC Krylia Sovetov Samara after resignation of Gadzhi Gadzhiyev. After 2 games in charge, he was appointed manager of FC Krylia Sovetov Samara on a permanent deal. After 28 matchdays of 2013–14 season, though, Krylia Sovetov failed to win a single match in 2014 and were close to relegation zone, and Tsygankov resigned.

Playing career
As a player, he made his professional debut in the Soviet Second League in 1986 for FC Spartak Zhytomyr. He played 3 games in the UEFA Cup 1994–95 for FC Tekstilshchik Kamyshin.

References

External links
 

1968 births
Sportspeople from Samara, Russia
Living people
Soviet footballers
Russian footballers
Association football midfielders
Association football defenders
FC Polissya Zhytomyr players
PFC Krylia Sovetov Samara players
FC Tekstilshchik Kamyshin players
FC Lada-Tolyatti players
Russian Premier League players
Russian football managers
FC Saturn Ramenskoye managers
PFC Krylia Sovetov Samara managers
Russian Premier League managers